Verkhnenazarovskoye is a rural locality (a selo) in Sadovskoye Rural Settlement of Krasnogvardeysky District, Adygea, Russia. The population was 581 as of 2018. There are 7 streets.

Geography 
Verkhnenazarovskoye is located 25 km southeast of Krasnogvardeyskoye (the district's administrative centre) by road. Sadovoye is the nearest rural locality.

Ethnicity 
The selo is inhabited by Kurds and Russians according to the 2010 census.

References 

Rural localities in Krasnogvardeysky District
Kurdish settlements